TSV Crailsheim is a German association football club from the town of Crailsheim, Baden-Württemberg.

History
Founded as the gymnastics club Turnverein Crailsheim in 1846, the association today has over 3,000 members in 20 departments, including athletics, basketball, cycling, dance sport, fistball, fencing, fitness, football, handball, jujutsu, judo, rehabilitation sport, swimming, table tennis, and tennis.

Several of the teams representing the club have enjoyed success: the women's football side plays in the 2. Bundesliga, the men's basketball team in the 2. Basketball-Bundesliga Süd, and the men's footballers in the Oberliga Baden-Württemberg (IV).

TSV was promoted to the Verbandsliga Württemberg (V) in 2001 and then advanced to the Oberliga Baden-Württemberg in 2003. In their first season at that level they narrowly missed quick promotion to the Regionalliga Süd (III) when they finished just one point behind FC Nöttingen.

After seven Oberliga seasons, the club suffered relegation in 2010 and decided to withdraw to the tier eight Bezirksliga Hohenlohe instead. After four seasons at this level the club won promotion back to the Landesliga Württemberg in 2014.

Honors
The club's honours:
 Verbandsliga Württemberg (V)
 Champions: 2003
 Bezirksliga Hohenlohe (VIII)
 Champions: 2014

Recent seasons
The recent season-by-season performance of the club:

 With the introduction of the Regionalligas in 1994 and the 3. Liga in 2008 as the new third tier, below the 2. Bundesliga, all leagues below dropped one tier.

References

External links
Official team site
Official team site (men's football)
Official team site (women's football)
Das deutsche Fußball-Archiv historical German domestic league tables (in German)

Women's football clubs in Germany
Football clubs in Germany
Football clubs in Baden-Württemberg
Association football clubs established in 1846
1846 establishments in Germany
Frauen-Bundesliga clubs